Ibrahim Kalil Fofana (born 24 June 1998) is a Guinean basketball player, who plays for SAC and the Guinea national basketball team.

Early life and career
Born in Conakry, Fofana played high school basketball in Canada with Georges Vanier Secondary School.

Since 2018, Fofana plays for SLAC of the Guinean Ligue 1. In December 2021, he helped the team qualify for the 2022 season of the Basketball Africa League (BAL).

National team career
Fofana has represented the Guinea national basketball team and played with his country at FIBA AfroBasket 2021.

Awards and accomplishments
SLAC
3× Ligue 1: (2019, 2020, 2021)

BAL career statistics

|-
|style="text-align:left;"|2022
|style="text-align:left;"|SLAC
| 6 || 6 || 25.6 || .333 || .286 || .500 || 5.0 || 1.8 || 0.7 || 0.5 || 3.2
|-
| colspan=2 align=center | Career ||  6 || 6 || 25.6 || .333 || .286 || .500 || 5.0 || 1.8 || 0.7 || 0.5 || 3.2

|}

References

External links
 Ibrahim Fofana at Eurobasket.com
 

1998 births
Living people
SLAC basketball players
Sportspeople from Conakry
Point guards
Guinean men's basketball players